The women's 1000 metres sprint event at the 2017 Summer Universiade was held on 22 August at the Yingfeng Riverside Park Roller Sports Rink (A).

Record

Results

Semifinal

Final

References 

Roller sports at the 2017 Summer Universiade